was a Japanese photographer who lived in and photographed Chichibu (Saitama).

Shimizu was born on 12 October 1913 in Chichibu, the eldest son of the family running a photography studio in Kumaki, Chichibu. His unusual given name, Bukō, is written with the same characters as those used for Mount Bukō; the family had intended it to be pronounced Takekatsu, but when interviewed in his late seventies Shimizu did not remember "Takekatsu" as having been used. In 1929, Shimizu's father suddenly gave up working at the family's photography studio in Chichibu, and the 16-year-old Bukō had to teach himself photographic technique (even the manufacture of photographic paper) from books bought second hand in order to keep the business running From around 1937 he also energetically photographed the topography and people of Chichibu.

Shimizu provided the photographs for a large number of books about the Chichibu area. In 1972 he won the annual award of the Photographic Society of Japan.

Shimizu also wrote much about Chichibu; a three-volume collection of his writings was published in 1983. He worked on behalf of the area's libraries and drama, and towards creation of Chichibu National Park.

Shimizu died on 23 January 1995.

Photographs by Shimizu are in the permanent collection of the Tokyo Metropolitan Museum of Photography.

Books by Shimizu

Chichibu no kao hyakunin. Chichibu: Chichibu no kao hyakunin-shū Dōjinsha, 1954.
Chichibu-ji. Tokyo: Shinseiki-sha, 1958.
Oku-Chichibu: Yamatabi to fūdo. Yamakei Bunko. Tokyo: Yamato Keikoku-sha, 1962. With Seiichirō Asami. 
Chichibu gensōkō: Kannon reijō, sono kokoro to fūdo. Tokyo: Mokujisha, 1968.
Chichibu: Shimizu Bukō sakuhinshū. Tokyo: Mokujisha, 1969.
Chichibu hika: Chichibu jiken no kokoro to fūdo. Tokyo: Shinjūsha, 1971.
Chichibu minzoku: Kōchi no hitobito. Tokyo: Mokujisha, 1971.
Chichibu: Furusato no kokoro. 2nd ed. Tokyo: Mokujisha, 1972.
Chichibu sankei. Tokyo: Shinjūsha, 1974.
Chichibu jōdo: Chichibu kannon reijō shashinshū. Tokyo: Shinjūsha, 1976.
Bukō-zan. Tokyo: Mokujisha, 1976.
Chichibu senchū no kiroku. Tokyo: Mokujisha, 1977.
Mitsumine-san: Shashinshū. Tokyo: Mokujisha, 1978.
Chichibu matsuri. Chichibu: Chichibu Matsuri Hozon Iinkai, 1979. With Hisashi Chishima. Expanded edition. Tokyo: Gensōsha, 1984.
Ningen Chichibu: Kage to hida no naka ni. Tokyo: Shinjūsha, 1980.
Chichibu. Furusato no omoide: Shashinshū Meiji–Taishō–Shōwa. Tokyo: Kokusho Kankō-kai, 1983. Edited by Shimizu and Hisashi Chishima.
Chichibu: Shimizu Bukō-shū. 3 vols. Tokyo: Gensōsha, 1983. Writing by Shimizu.
1. Fūdokō. 
2. Yama to seikatsu. 
3. Shashin saijiki. 
Chichibu bandō kannon reijō. Shin-jinbutsu-ōrai-sha, 1984. .
Chichibu-gaku nyūmon: Waga-ai suru fūdo e. Sakitama Sōsho. Urawa: Sakitama Shuppankai, 1984. . Edited by Shimizu.
Chichibu-ji 50-nen. Tonbo no Hon. Tokyo: Shinchōsha, 1986. . With Hisashi Chishima.
Chichibu jinja. Sakitama Bunko 2. Urawa: Sakitama Shuppankai, 1989. . Text by Hisashi Chishima.
Shimizu Bukō sensei kenshō-hi shunkō kinenshi. Chichibu: Shimizu Bukō sensei kenshō-kai, 1998.

Notes

External links
. Saitama prefectural website.

Japanese photographers
People from Saitama Prefecture
1913 births
1995 deaths